Lipase family member N is a protein that in humans is encoded by the LIPN gene.

Function

The gene encodes a lipase that is highly expressed in granular keratinocytes in the epidermis, and plays a role in the differentiation of keratinocytes. Mutations in this gene are associated with lamellar ichthyosis type 4. [provided by RefSeq, Dec 2011].

References

Further reading